Kuchh Meetha Ho Jaye (translation: Let's Have Something Sweet) is a 2005 Bollywood romance film directed by Samar Khan as his debut film. It starred Arshad Warsi, Mahima Chaudhry, Parvin Dabas, while Shah Rukh Khan had a special appearance as himself.

Plot 
A plane-load of passengers are stranded in distant Ganganagar in rural India as their plane is unable to take off due to technical problems. The Airport Manager is S.R. Khan, intoxicated and belligerent at most times, gets to meet his former sweetheart, Gulab Khan, in the company of her husband; his wise-cracking Sikh Assistant, Ram Saran Dubey, whose mother is a Sardarni, while his dad is from Bihar; An estranged father, Sunil Wadhwa, and his wife try to pacify their daughter into accepting their imminent separation; while Italian Siddharth has only a few hours to make up his mind who he wants to marry, Anita Ahuja or Manju Narang, who both happen to be cousins, and both aggressively want to be his wife; The Pilot Captain Vikram Sinha is shattered when he gets the news that his affair with air-hostess, Rachna, has resulted in a much avoidable pregnancy; and Internet lovers Farha and Rahul finally meet - only to come to face with reality as Farha's father does not approve of her affair with Rahul, and does not want her to come home. Farha also goes missing then. All this happens in the midst of a mysterious male who is asleep on a bench in the Airport Lounge, and he is not to be disturbed under any circumstances. The mysterious male turns out to be Farha's idol Shah Rukh Khan, who persuades her to go back home with Rahul, and makes sure that their parents approve it.

Cast 
 Arshad Warsi as Manager S.R Khan
 Mahima Chaudhry as Ghulab Khan
 Aditya Lakhia as Tanny
 Parvin Dabas as  Siddharth
 Sandhya Mridul as Rachna Singh
 Deepti Naval
 Rohit Roy as Pilot Vikram Sinha
 Shravan as Rahul
 Sachin Khedekar as Suniel Wadhwa
 Iravati Harshe as Vibha Wadhwa
 Kanwaljit Singh as Col. Bhabus Shamsher Kapoor 
 Jaspal Bhatti as Ram Saran Dubey
 Mrinal Kulkarni as Chanchal Chugh
 Ashwin Mushran as Ben Sidebottom
 Nassar Abdullah as Gul Khan
 Shah Rukh Khan as himself (Cameo)

Soundtrack

 
The soundtrack of Kuchh Meetha Ho Jaye consists of seven songs composed by Himesh Reshammiya, the lyrics of which were written by Sameer.

References

External links 
 

2005 films
2000s Hindi-language films
2005 romantic comedy films
Films scored by Himesh Reshammiya
Indian romantic comedy films